Stand or The Stand may refer to:

 To assume the upright position of standing
 Forest stand, a group of trees
 Area of seating in a stadium, such as bleachers
 Stand (cricket), a relationship between two players
 Stand (drill pipe), 2 or 3 joints of drill pipe connected together on a drilling rig
 Bus stand, where public service vehicles are parked between journeys; or specific stops in a bus station
 Tree stand, platform used in hunting
 The Stand Comedy Club, in Edinburgh, Glasgow and Newcastle upon Tyne
 Stand, Greater Manchester, a residential area in England
 STAND (organization) (originally Students Taking Action Now: Darfur), a student activist group under Aegis Trust
 A food business:
 Fruit stand
 Hot dog stand
 Lemonade stand
 A support or holder, such as:
 Standing frame, assistive technology supporting a person who could not otherwise stand erect
 Kickstand of a bicycle or motorcycle
 Christmas tree stand
 Music stand
 Cymbal stand
 Retort stand, a laboratory equipment

Music 
 Stand (Irish band), a New York–based Dublin four-piece band

Albums 
 Stand (Avalon album)
 Stand (Breaking the Silence album)
 Stand (Michael W. Smith album)
 Stand!, by Sly and the Family Stone

Songs 
 "Stand" (Jewel song)
 "Stand" (Lenny Kravitz song)
 "Stand" (Poison song)
 "Stand" (Rascal Flatts song)
 "Stand" (R.E.M. song)
 "Stand!" (song), by Sly and the Family Stone
 "Stand", by Candlebox on the album Into the Sun
 "Stand", by Petra on the album Jekyll & Hyde
 "The Stand" (song), by Mother Mother
 "The Stand", by The Alarm
 "The Stand", by Hillsong United on the album United We Stand
 "The Stand", by Michael W. Smith on the album Stand
 "The Stand (Man or Machine)", by The Protomen on the album The Protomen

Books, film, and television 
 The Stand, a 1978 novel by Stephen King
 The Stand (1994 miniseries), based on the novel
 The Stand (comics), 2008–2012, based on the novel
 The Stand (2020 miniseries), based on the novel
 Stand, a supernatural power in the manga, anime, and game series JoJo's Bizarre Adventure
 STAND, an organization in the anime Virus Buster Serge
 Stand! (film), 2019 Canadian musical film

See also 
 Stand-in (disambiguation)
 The Stands, English band
 Stent (disambiguation)